Kyle Ko Halehale (born 3 June 2002) is a Guamanian footballer who plays as a midfielder for Central Connecticut State Blue Devils and the Guam national team.

College career 
Halehale started all seven of CCSU's games in the shortened 2020 season, where he scored two goals. He scored his first goal in a 3–0 win vs. Fairleigh Dickinson on 22 March 2021.

International career
Halehale was part of Guam under-17 team during qualifying rounds of 2016 AFC U-16 Championship and 2018 AFC U-16 Championship. Halehale netted one goal each against Malaysia and against Singapore.

Halehale made his senior team debut on 2 September 2018, coming on as a 69th minute substitute for Shawn Nicklaw in a 4–0 win against Northern Mariana Islands.

Career statistics

International

References

External links
 

2002 births
Living people
Association football midfielders
Guamanian footballers
Guam international footballers
People from Tamuning, Guam